The New Galloway Town Hall is a municipal building in Dumfries and Galloway, Scotland, situated on the town's high street. A tolbooth has existed on the site of the current building since at least 1711; in 1875, it was rebuilt and enlarged. In 1971 it was designated a Category B listed building.

Description
New Galloway Town Hall stands on the east side of the High Street, at a crossroads with East Port. It is a two-storey, five-bay building, with a square tower at its north end. The tower has clock faces near the top, and a steep pyramid spire,  with louvered lucarnes, and ball finials on each corner and the peak.

The main entrance to the building is in the west face of the tower, through a round-arched doorway. Above the door is an armorial panel, which may be eighteenth-century in date, and above that is a window with a yett, from which is suspended a set of jougs. 

On the west wall, between two of the windows near the roofline, is a panel that reads "Rebuilt and enlarged 1875".

History
There has been a tolbooth on the site of the current building since at least 1711, when two bells were cast for the tower by Robert Maxwell of Edinburgh. An engraving of around 1798 shows the structure of the time, with a square tower much like the current one, but with a narrow spire rising above a crenellated parapet.

In 1837, the tolbooth had two cells, one for criminals, and a larger one for debtors, both on the first floor. The clock mechanism in the tower, which is still in use , was made by Gillett and Bland of Croydon in 1872, replacing an older mechanism which has been described as "utterly worthless as a time keeper". The bells currently hanging in the tower are not the originals: one was recast in 1812, the other in 1872, but both re-castings reproduced the ornaments and inscriptions on the original 1711 bells. 

The building was remodelled in 1875 by the architect Francis Armstrong of Dalbeattie, and it was cement rendered in 1878, making it difficult to interpret its earlier history, but it is likely that some of its existing structure dates from the eighteenth century, perhaps as early as 1711. The current entrance in the tower's west face was installed in 1895.

The building was designated a Category B listed building in 1971. It continued to serve as the meeting place of the burgh council for much of the 20th century but ceased to be the local seat of government when the enlarged Stewartry District Council was formed in 1975.

In 2021, Local Initiatives in New Galloway ("LING") offered to buy the building from Dumfries and Galloway Council for a nominal sum. In 2022, they submitted proposals to refurbish the building.

Artworks
Works of art in the town hall include an 1883 painting by James Faed the younger entitled "The Town Park".

See also
 List of listed buildings in New Galloway, Dumfries and Galloway

References

Sources

Category B listed buildings in Dumfries and Galloway
Government buildings completed in 1875
City chambers and town halls in Scotland